SpaceX CRS-22, also known as SpX-22, was a Commercial Resupply Services (CRS) mission to the International Space Station (ISS) that launched at 17:29:15 UTC on 3 June 2021. The mission is contracted by NASA and is flown by SpaceX using a Cargo Dragon 2. This is the second flight for SpaceX under NASA's CRS Phase 2 contract awarded in January 2016.

Cargo Dragon 

SpaceX plans to reuse the Cargo Dragons up to five times. Since it does not support a crew, the Cargo Dragon launches without SuperDraco abort engines, seats, cockpit controls or the life support system required to sustain astronauts in space. Dragon 2 improves on Dragon 1 in several ways, including lessened refurbishment time, leading to shorter periods between flights.

The new Cargo Dragon capsules under the NASA CRS Phase 2 contract splash down under parachutes in the Gulf of Mexico rather than the previous recovery zone in the Pacific Ocean west of Baja California under the NASA CRS Phase 1 contract.

Payload 

NASA contracted for the CRS-22 mission from SpaceX and therefore determines the primary payload, date of launch, and orbital parameters for the Cargo Dragon.

 Science investigations: 
 Vehicle hardware: 
 Crew supplies: 
 Spacewalk equipment: 
 Computer resources: 
 External payloads:   

ISS Roll Out Solar Arrays (iROSA)

First pair of new roll-out solar arrays, namely, 2B and 4B; using XTJ Prime space solar cells, based on design tested at ISS in 2017. They will be delivered to the station in the unpressurized trunk of the SpaceX Cargo Dragon CRS-22 spacecraft. A second pair was delivered to the ISS on CRS-26 in late 2022, followed by another pair on CRS-28 due to be delivered in june 2023. The installation of these new solar arrays requires two spacewalks: one to prepare the worksite with a modification kit, on 16 June 2021, and another to install the new panel, on 20 June 2021.

Additional hardware carried internally includes:
 Catalytic Reactor: legacy unit launching to provide critical sparing support for the water production capability for the environmental control and life support system (ECLSS)
 Commercial Crew Vehicle Emergency Breathing Air Assembly (CEBAA) Regulator Manifold Assembly (RMA): completing the first set of emergency air supply capability, this integrated system supports as many as five crew members for up to 1 hour during an ISS emergency ammonia leak
 Zarya Kurs Electronics Unit: critical hardware for cosmonaut remote-control docking of Russian spacecraft is launching to support planned maintenance activity during 2021
 Potable Water Dispenser (PWD) Filter: major filter assembly used to remove iodine from water consumed by the crew during nominal operations
 Commercial off-the-shelf (COTS) Air Tanks: critical disposable air tanks to support gas resupply for routine cabin repress activities in-orbit
 Iceberg: critical cold stowage capability to support expanded payload operations

Research 
The new experiments arriving at the orbiting laboratory on the SpaceX CRS-22 mission supports science from human health to high-powered computing, and utilizes the space station as a proving ground for new technologies.

Among the investigations arriving inside the Dragon's pressurized capsule will be a variety of research experiments and studies, including:

 Develop better pharmaceuticals and therapies for treating kidney disease on Earth
 Using cotton root systems to identify varieties of plants that require less water and pesticides
 Test new portable ultrasound technology in microgravity (Butterfly IQ Ultrasound)

Two model organism investigations: 
 One study will look at bobtail squid as a model to examine the effects of spaceflight on interactions between beneficial microbes and their animal hosts
 Second study will examine tardigrades' adaptation to the harsh environment of space, which could contribute to long-term problem solving for vaccine production, distribution, and storage on Earth

NASA Glenn Research Center studies:
 Combustion Integration Rack (CIR) Reconfiguration

Student Spaceflight Experiments Program

The Student Spaceflight Experiments Program (SSEP) has five experiments manifested:
 Mission 14B – 3 experiments 
 Mission 15A – 2 experiments 

ISS United States National Laboratory

The ISS U.S. National Laboratory is sponsoring more than a dozen payloads with education and commercial partners. These include:
 Colgate-Palmolive – oral biofilms investigation
 Eli Lilly – investigation to examine the effects of gravity on the physical state and properties of freeze-dried pharmaceutical products

CubeSats 
ELaNa 36: One CubeSat is scheduled for deployment on this mission:

 RamSat – Oak Ridge Public Schools (Robertsville Middle School), Oak Ridge, Tennessee

Nanoracks CubeSat deployments:

 SOAR – University of Manchester, United Kingdom and the DISCOVERER consortium with EU/EC Horizon 2020 funding.

UNOOSA / JAXA KiboCUBE program:
 MIR-SAT1 – Mauritius Research and Innovation Council (MRIC)
 G-SATELLITE 2 – OneTeam, Tokyo Organising Committee of the Olympic and Paralympic Games (TOCOG)

Returning hardware 

Beginning with returning capsules or lifting bodies under the CRS-2 contract, NASA reports major hardware (failed or expended hardware for diagnostic assessment, refurbishment, repair, or no longer needed) returning from the International Space Station.

 Catalytic Reactor Developmental Test Objective (DTO): developmental environmental control and life support system (ECLSS) unit returning for testing, teardown, and evaluation (TT&E) to determine the cause of failure and subsequent re-flight
 Urine Processing Assembly (UPA) Distillation Assembly: critical ECLSS orbital replacement unit used for urine distillation, processing, and future use returning for TT&E and refurbishment to support future spares demand
 Sabatier Main Controller: major Sabatier system hardware used in conjunction with the Oxygen Generation System (OGS) for water production needs on-orbit
 Rodent Research Habitats (AEM-X): habitats used during Rodent Research missions returning for refurbishment to support future missions in early 2022
 Nitrogen/Oxygen Recharge System (NORS) Recharge Tank Assembly (RTA): empty gas tanks returning for reuse to support high-pressure gas operations and activities on-orbit

See also 
 Uncrewed spaceflights to the International Space Station

References

External links 
 NASA
 SpaceX official page for the Dragon spacecraft 

SpaceX Dragon 2
SpaceX payloads contracted by NASA
Supply vehicles for the International Space Station
Spacecraft launched in 2021
2021 in the United States
Spacecraft which reentered in 2021